Thomas Law Brown (17 April 1921 – 10 May 1966) was a Scottish footballer who played for clubs including Heart of Midlothian, Millwall, Charlton Athletic and Leyton Orient, as a wing half. In a career interrupted by World War II, he had been selected for the Scottish League XI within his first season as a professional at Hearts aged 17, and played for Scotland in three unofficial wartime international matches, two of them while still a teenager. After the war, he moved to English football, playing only for clubs in east London.

Brown was born in the small Ayrshire mining community of Glenbuck which produced several professional footballers, among them a pair of brothers with the same surname and even including another Tommy Brown; however, it is believed he was not directly related to them.

References

1921 births
1966 deaths
Footballers from East Ayrshire
Association football wing halves
Scottish footballers
Cambuslang Rangers F.C. players
Heart of Midlothian F.C. players
Millwall F.C. players
Charlton Athletic F.C. players
Leyton Orient F.C. players
Dartford F.C. players
Scottish Football League players
Scottish Junior Football Association players
Scottish Football League representative players
English Football League players
Scotland wartime international footballers
Scotland junior international footballers